Opinion polling for the 2020 election may refer to:

 Opinion polling for the 2020 New Zealand general election
 Nationwide opinion polling for the 2020 United States presidential election
 Statewide opinion polling for the 2020 United States presidential election